Robbie is an American comedy television series created by Rory Scovel, Stuart Jenkins, Scott Moran, and Anthony King. The series premiered on Comedy Central on May 7, 2020, and its entire first season was released on Comedy Central's YouTube channel, app, website, and on demand immediately following its premiere.

Premise
Robbie, an overzealous small town youth basketball coach, attempts to step out of his father's shadow and lead his team to glory.

Cast
 Rory Scovel as Robbie
 Sasheer Zamata as Ava
 Mary Holland as Janie
 Tre Stokes as Caleb
 Jill Jane Clements as Beatrice
 Beau Bridges as Robbie Walton Sr.

Episodes

References

External links

2020s American comedy television series
2020 American television series debuts
2020 American television series endings
Comedy Central original programming
English-language television shows